Caerphilly is a town in south Wales.

Caerphilly  may also refer to:

 Caerphilly County Borough, a county borough in southern Wales
 Caerphilly cheese
 Caerphilly (Senedd constituency)
 Caerphilly (UK Parliament constituency)
 Caerphilly railway station